The Garðskagaviti Lighthouse is a lighthouse located in Iceland, in the Southern Peninsula. The lighthouse was constructed in 1897.

History and description 
The Garðskagaviti was constructed in 1897. In 1947, another lighthouse was constructed to the east, replacing the original lighthouse.

See also 

 List of lighthouses in Iceland

References

Lighthouses completed in 1897
Lighthouses in Iceland
Buildings and structures in Southern Peninsula (Iceland)
1897 establishments in Iceland